The 2012–13 Coppa Italia was contested by four teams. HC Valpellice defeated HC Alleghe to win the cup. The tournament was played over two days, from January 12–13, 2013. The top four teams in the Serie A at the time participated in the cup.

Tournament

Semifinals
HC Alleghe - AS Renon 3:2 OT (0:1, 0:0, 2:1, 1:0)
HC Val Pusteria Wolves - HC Valpellice 1:5 (0:2, 1:3, 0:0)

Final
HC Alleghe - HC Valpellice 3:7 (1:3, 1:2, 1:2)

External links
Tournament on hockeyarchives.info

Coppa Italia
Coppa Italia